Workington is a town on the west coast of Cumberland, England.

Workington may also refer to:

 Workington (Harare), an industrial suburb in Zimbabwe
 Workington (UK Parliament constituency), a House of Commons constituency in Cumberland
 Workington A.F.C., an English football club based in Workington, Cumberland

See also
 Worthington (disambiguation)